Volga Margaret Hayworth (August 8, 1897 – January 25, 1945) was an American dancer and vaudevillian. A popular showgirl on Broadway, she was the mother of actress Rita Hayworth, who used her mother's maiden name as her professional surname.

Biography
Hayworth was born on August 8, 1897, in Washington, D.C., the daughter of Allynn Duran Hayworth and Margaret O'Hare. Her younger brother was actor Vinton Hayworth. 

She appeared in the Ziegfeld Follies, met her husband, the Spanish-born dancer Eduardo Cansino in 1916 and married him in 1917. They had three children. She and her husband formed a vaudeville act, The Dancing Cansinos.

Volga Hayworth Cansino died in 1945, at the age of 47, from undisclosed causes, in Santa Monica, California.

Immediate family
Husband: Eduardo Cansino, born on  – died on 
 Rita Hayworth, born Margarita Carmen Cansino on October 17, 1918 – died on 
 Rebecca Welles, born on December 17, 1944 – died on 
 Marc McKerrow, born on March 31, 1966 – died on 
 Yasmin Aga Khan, born on December 28, 1949 
 Andrew Ali Aga Khan Embiricos, born on  – died on December 4, 2011 (aged 25)
 Eduardo Cansino, Jr., born on  – died on 
 Vernon Cansino, born on  – died on March 23, 1974 (aged 51)

Notes

References

External links

People from Greater Los Angeles
1897 births
1945 deaths
Actresses from Washington, D.C.
American female dancers
Vaudeville performers
20th-century American actresses
Dancers from Washington, D.C.
20th-century American dancers
Ziegfeld Follies
Cansino family